The Way It Is is Bruce Hornsby and the Range's debut album, released by RCA Records in 1986. Led by its hit title track, the album went on to achieve multi-platinum status and helped the group to win the Grammy Award for Best New Artist. Other hits from the album include "Mandolin Rain" and "Every Little Kiss". Huey Lewis features on harmonica and vocals on "Down the Road Tonight". Lewis also co-produced the song, along with the tracks "The Long Race" and "The River Runs Low".

Releases
The original release of the album featured an impressionistic photograph on the cover of Bruce Hornsby playing an accordion. It was originally targeted at the New Age music market and featured slightly different versions of the songs "Down the Road Tonight" and "The River Runs Low."

Once the album's tracks started to receive regular airplay on Pop music stations in late 1986, the album was remixed and was re-released with a new sepia-toned cover featuring a photo of the band superimposed over a photo of the Chesapeake Bay Bridge-Tunnel in Virginia.

Track listing

Tracks 2 and 5 written by Bruce Hornsby; all other songs written by Bruce Hornsby and John Hornsby. Track times are for the current release of the album. The opening of "Every Little Kiss" features an extended quotation from the opening of Movement III, The Alcotts, from Charles Ives's Piano Sonata No. 2.

Live: The Way It Is Tour 1986-87 track listing

Produced by DIR Broadcasting for the King Biscuit Flower Hour.  Recorded live at The Ritz, New York City, February 2, 1987 by Effanel Music.

Personnel
Bruce Hornsby and The Range
 Bruce Hornsby – vocals, grand piano, synthesizer, hammered dulcimer, accordion
 David Mansfield – guitar, mandolin, violin
 George Marinelli – acoustic guitar, electric guitar, backing vocals
 Joe Puerta – bass, backing vocals
 John Molo – drums, percussion

Additional personnel
 Huey Lewis – harmonica, backing vocals on "Down the Road Tonight"
John Gilutin and Sean Hopper – synthesizer consultants

Production
 Executive Producer – Paul Atkinson
 Tracks #1-3, 5, 7 & 9 produced by Bruce Hornsby and Elliot Scheiner (for Trackman, Inc.); Tracks #4, 6 & 8 produced by Huey Lewis.
 Recorded and Engineered by Elliot Scheiner (Tracks #1-3, 5, 7 & 9) and Jim Gaines (Tracks #4, 6 & 8).
 Additional Engineers – Eddie King and Jeff "Nik" Norman
 Assistant Engineers – Jim "Watts" Vereecke and Lenette Viegas.
 Mixed by Eddie King, David Luke, Don Smith and Elliot Scheiner.
 Mixed at Fantasy Studios (Berkeley, CA); Conway Studios (Hollywood, CA); The Village Recorder and The Complex (Los Angeles, CA); Rumbo Recorders (Canoga Park, CA).
 Mastered by Stephen Marcussen at Precision Mastering (Hollywood, CA).
 Digital Editing by Bob Harlan
 Production Assistant – Ivy Skoff
 A&R Coordination – Marge Meoli
 Art Direction and Design – Ted Raess
 Art Consultant – Kathy Hornsby
 Photography – Aaron Rapoport
 Inner Sleeve Photo – Robert Llewellyn
 Management – Tim Neece
 Enforcement – Jeff Gerson

Charts and certifications

Weekly charts

Year-end charts

Certifications

References 

1986 debut albums
Bruce Hornsby albums
RCA Records albums